William Pierce is the name of:

Politics
 William Pierce (politician) (1753–1789), Continental Congressman from Georgia
 William Luther Pierce (1933–2002), white nationalist and political activist
 Bud Pierce (William C. Pierce, born 1956), politician in Oregon

Sports
 Billy Pierce (Walter William Pierce, 1927–2015), American baseball player
 Bill Pierce (baseball) (William Herbert Pierce, 1890–1962), Negro leagues baseball player and manager

Other
 William Pierce (serial killer) (1931–2020), American serial killer also known as "Junior"
 William Henry Pierce (missionary) (1856–1948), Canadian missionary for the Methodist church
 William H. Pierce (1859–1939), American mortuarist
 William S. Pierce (born 1937), American surgeon and chemical engineer
 William Pierce (robber), perpetrator of the Great Gold Robbery

See also 
 Bill Pierce (disambiguation)
 Pierce (surname)
 William Pearce (disambiguation)
 William Peirce (disambiguation)